Protein tyrosine phosphatase type IVA 1 is an enzyme that in humans is encoded by the PTP4A1 gene.

The protein encoded by this gene belongs to a small class of prenylated protein tyrosine phosphatases (PTPs), which contains a PTP domain and a characteristic C-terminal prenylation motif. PTPs are cell signaling molecules that play regulatory roles in a variety of cellular processes. This tyrosine phosphatase is a nuclear protein, but may primarily associate with plasma membrane. The surface membrane association of this protein depends on its C-terminal prenylation. Overexpression of this gene in mammalian cells conferred a transformed phenotype, which implicated its role in the tumorigenesis. Studies in rat suggested that this gene may be an immediate-early gene in mitogen-stimulated cells.

Interactions
PTP4A1 has been shown to interact with ATF7.

References

Further reading